Roberto Soldado Rillo (born 27 May 1985) is a Spanish professional footballer who plays as a striker for Segunda División club Levante.

After emerging through Real Madrid's youth system, he went on to appear in only 27 official matches for the first team (four goals). However, he became a more regular La Liga player and goalscorer for Osasuna, Getafe and Valencia, and secured a £26 million move to Tottenham Hotspur. After two unsuccessful seasons in England, he returned to the Spanish top division with Villarreal.

An international since 2007, Soldado represented Spain at the 2013 FIFA Confederations Cup.

Club career

Real Madrid
Born in Valencia, Soldado joined Real Madrid at the age of 15 from native region small club CF Don Bosco. After years of prolific goalscoring with the former's reserves, he made his first-team debut on 23 October 2005 against Valencia, playing 18 minutes in a 1–2 home loss. Previously, on 28 September, he had scored an 86th-minute winner after just six minutes on the pitch in the group stage of the UEFA Champions League against Olympiacos (2–1 home win), adding a late equaliser against Osasuna and another in a 3–2 victory at Racing de Santander as Real finished second in the league, also netting in the 4–0 defeat of Athletic Bilbao in the Copa del Rey.

In 2005–06, with Castilla, Soldado scored 19 goals in Segunda División – two penalties – to become joint-second highest goalscorer alongside Ciudad de Murcia's José Juan Luque, one behind Ikechukwu Uche of Recreativo de Huelva. On 24 July 2006, he officially became the first member of Real Madrid to leave under new manager Fabio Capello and new president Ramón Calderón, moving to fellow La Liga side Osasuna on a season-long loan; he stated: "The idea is to leave and have a good season with a first division team scoring goals, and to develop as a footballer". His new team had finished fourth the previous campaign to earn themselves a place in the third qualifying round of the Champions League, hence he chose them over a number of other Spanish clubs competing for his presence. "The following year I want to return to the Real first team. I chose Osasuna because it gives me the chance to play in the Champions League", he said to Real Madrid's website after his signing; he finished with a total of 13 goals in all competitions, making him the Navarrese's top scorer.

Soldado returned to Real Madrid where, on 11 July 2007, he renewed his contract until 30 June 2012. In a 21 July interview with Spanish newspaper Diario AS, he revealed that he would be wearing number 9 shirt in his second stint: "During the preseason I'll be number 9, the number I've always dreamed of. When I step onto the pitch at the Bernabéu I'll remember all the hard work it took to get here". However, he finished the season with just five league appearances (one start, at Deportivo de La Coruña), the second with fewer minutes for the league champions.

Getafe
In late July 2008, Soldado was sold to Getafe for €4 million, signing a four-year deal with the club from the Madrid outskirts. He scored his first goal for them on 19 October in a 2–1 away loss against Málaga, adding two in another away defeat, with Osasuna (5–2), two months later; in between, he was sent off in a 0–3 home loss to Valencia for a headbutt on Carlos Marchena.

On 25 January 2009, Soldado scored a hat-trick as an early substitute, in a 5–1 home win over Sporting de Gijón. On 22 March, as Getafe struggled in the league, he scored twice to secure another home victory, 2–1 against Recreativo. The following month, he opened the 3–2 away defeat against his first employers.

Soldado started 2009–10 in impressive fashion, putting three goals past Racing Santander in a 4–1 away win. After a long scoring drought, he added three more against newly promoted Xerez in a 5–1 home victory.

On 19 December 2009, Soldado took his league tally to ten after scoring twice in a 2–1 defeat of Sevilla; with this achievement, he became Getafe's best ever scorer in the first division, surpassing Manu del Moral and Dani Güiza. He missed one month of competition due to injury but, in his return to action, scored from a bicycle kick, earning his side a point in the 1–1 home draw with Gijón.

Valencia

In early June 2010, after a successful year – 16 league goals, and qualification for the UEFA Europa League – Soldado returned to his hometown and signed for Valencia for €10 million, replacing Barcelona-bound David Villa. In his first official game, on 14 September, in the Champions League group phase, he contributed one goal in the Ches 4–0 win at Bursaspor. When the two teams met at the Mestalla Stadium in November, he netted two more in a 6–1 victory.

On 2 April 2011, Soldado scored all of Valencia's goals in a 4–2 away defeat of former club Getafe. In the next fixture, a local derby against Villarreal, he scored two more in a 5–0 home win. He finished the season as joint-fourth top scorer as his team ranked third and qualified for the Champions League.

In his first game of 2011–12, Soldado scored four goals against Racing Santander (one in his own net) in an eventual 4–3 home win – his last two arrived in the final three minutes. In late November 2011, in two home games separated by only five days, he added five more: two in a 2–3 home loss to Real Madrid and three in a 7–0 Champions League rout of Genk.

Soldado scored his 25th competitive goal of the campaign on 18 March 2012, netting all of his team's in a 3–0 win at Bilbao. In late June, he extended his contract until 2017.

On 23 October 2012, Soldado scored a hat-trick against BATE Borisov in a 3–0 victory in the Champions League group stage in Minsk.

Tottenham Hotspur

Valencia agreed a deal with Tottenham Hotspur for the transfer of Soldado on 1 August 2013, for a fee of £26 million, which would break the English club's previous record of £17 million paid for Paulinho earlier in the summer; the transfer was completed four days later after a successful medical. On his Premier League debut on 18 August, he scored through a penalty in a 1–0 win against Crystal Palace at Selhurst Park. Four days later, he netted a brace in a 5–0 victory at Dinamo Tbilisi in the playoff round of the Europa League.

On 20 October 2013, Soldado scored his first Premier League goal from open play, in a 2–0 victory against Aston Villa at Villa Park. Two months later he netted his first hat-trick for Tottenham, against Anzhi Makhachkala in the Europa League group stage (4–1).

Soldado scored the only goal against relegation-threatened Cardiff City on 2 March 2014, his first in nine games. He netted just six times in his debut season with the Spurs, only two of which came from open play, and was included in The Telegraph website's list of the "10 worst buys of the Premier League season".

On 18 October 2014, making his first league start of the campaign, Soldado set up Christian Eriksen's goal during the match against Manchester City, also having a penalty saved by Joe Hart in an eventual 4–1 away loss. His first goal came on 30 November, the decisive in a 2–1 home defeat of Everton.

Villarreal
On 14 August 2015, Soldado returned to his country's top flight, signing a three-year contract with Villarreal for a reported £10 million. He scored in his very first appearance, helping to a 1–1 draw at Real Betis in which he started and retired injured midway through the second half.

On 13 December 2015, Soldado netted the game's only goal to help defeat his former club Real Madrid at the Estadio El Madrigal. He missed the vast majority of 2016–17, due to an anterior cruciate ligament injury to his right knee contracted in pre-season.

Fenerbahçe
On 11 August 2017, Fenerbahçe announced the signing of Soldado. After failing to find the net in his first ten games, he scored a hat-trick as a 61st-minute substitute on 19 November in a 4–1 home win over Sivasspor.

Soldado announced that he would not renew his contract on 2 June 2019.

Granada
On 15 July 2019, Soldado signed a one-year contract with recently promoted Granada, making him Diego Martínez's fourth signing of the summer transfer window. He made his competitive debut on 17 August, starting and scoring in a 4–4 draw against Villarreal, and remained a starter as the side qualified for Europe for the first time after a seventh-place finish. In April 2020, the club activated prematurely the contract clause that would keep him for another season.

On 17 September 2020, Soldado scored the first goal in the Andalusians' European history, in a 4–0 win at Albania's Teuta Durrës in the second qualifying round. He netted twice more in their run to the quarter-finals, one in each leg of a 3–2 aggregate victory over Norwegians Molde in the last 16.

Levante
Soldado joined Levante on 28 June 2021, on a two-year contract.

International career
Soldado represented Spain at all its youth levels, scoring a total of 26 goals. He was first called up to the first team in June 2007 for two UEFA Euro 2008 qualifiers, against Latvia and Liechtenstein, playing in both. He did not make it to the finals in Switzerland and Austria, however, as the nation emerged victorious.

On 29 February 2012, after nearly five years of absence, Soldado returned to the national team: he replaced Fernando Llorente at half-time of a friendly with Venezuela in Málaga, scoring twice after only seven minutes on the pitch; afterwards, he won a penalty and the sending off of Fernando Amorebieta, but missed the ensuing attempt, only to close the score at 5–0 in the 83rd minute.

Manager Vicente del Bosque selected Soldado for the 2013 FIFA Confederations Cup squad. He scored in the opener on 16 June, helping Spain to a 2–1 win over Uruguay.

Career statistics
Club

International

Scores and results list Spain's goal tally first, score column indicates score after each Soldado goal.

HonoursReal MadridLa Liga: 2007–08Tottenham HotspurFootball League Cup runner-up: 2014–15Spain U19UEFA European Under-19 Championship: 2004SpainFIFA Confederations Cup runner-up: 2013Individual'
Zarra Trophy (Segunda División): 2005–06
Zarra Trophy (La Liga): 2011–12

References

External links

1985 births
Living people
Spanish footballers
Footballers from Valencia (city)
Association football forwards
La Liga players
Segunda División players
Segunda División B players
Real Madrid Castilla footballers
Real Madrid CF players
CA Osasuna players
Getafe CF footballers
Valencia CF players
Villarreal CF players
Granada CF footballers
Levante UD footballers
Premier League players
Tottenham Hotspur F.C. players
Süper Lig players
Fenerbahçe S.K. footballers
Spain youth international footballers
Spain under-21 international footballers
Spain international footballers
2013 FIFA Confederations Cup players
Spanish expatriate footballers
Expatriate footballers in England
Expatriate footballers in Turkey
Spanish expatriate sportspeople in England
Spanish expatriate sportspeople in Turkey